Fredyryk Chesster Siason-Chay, popularly known as Chesster Chay (born August 8, 1989 in San Jose del Monte, Bulacan, Philippines), is a television actor and commercial model who works in Filipino productions.

Biography
Chay is the son of Alfredo Chay, and the brother of Chessander, and Chessandra Chay. Chay is currently seen. in the TV fantasy series Bantatay of GMA Network, as one of the performers in P.O.5 of TV5, and as a correspondent in 30w POwhz with Ryan Bang of ABS-CBN's affiliate station Studio 23. Working in three giant networks of the country ( GMA Network, TV5 and ABS-CBN ).

Education
Chay is currently taking Bachelor of Science in Information Technology.

Filmtography

Television

External links 
 profile at Facebook website.

Living people
1989 births
People from San Jose del Monte
Male actors from Bulacan